is a Singaporean footballer currently playing as a defender for Albirex Niigata Singapore.

Career statistics

Club

Notes

International statistics

U19 International caps

U17 International caps

References

2004 births
Living people
Singaporean footballers
Japanese footballers
Association football defenders
Singapore Premier League players
Albirex Niigata Singapore FC players
Singaporean people of Japanese descent